Porsche is a German surname, well known with its connection to the car company of the same name.

Ferdinand Porsche, (1875–1951) founder of design office that made cars, Dr. Ing. h.c. F. Porsche GmbH
Ferdinand Alexander Porsche ("Butzi"), (1935–2012) car designer, son of Ferdinand Anton Ernst Porsche
Ferdinand Anton Ernst Porsche (or Ferry Porsche), (1909–1998) automotive engineer and designer, son of Ferdinand Porsche
Ferdinand Oliver Porsche, (b. 1961) German lawyer, son of Ferdinand Alexander Porsche
Louise Piëch (née Louise Porsche), (1904–1999) daughter of Ferdinand Porsche, mother of Ferdinand Piëch
Gertrude Porsche-Schinkeová, Czechoslovak luger
Susanne Porsche (or Susanne Bresser), (1952– ) German film producer

See also
Porsche family tree

German-language surnames